Wielki Bór may refer to the following places:
Wielki Bór, Greater Poland Voivodeship (west-central Poland)
Wielki Bór, Łódź Voivodeship (central Poland)
Wielki Bór, Podlaskie Voivodeship (north-east Poland)